Harry Morgan (1915–2011) was an American television and film actor and director.

Harry Morgan may also refer to:
Harry Morgan (footballer) (1889–1956), Australian rules footballer
Harry H. Morgan (1871–1924), Australian rules footballer, with Carlton FC.
Harry S. Morgan (1945–2011), German film actor, director and producer
Harry Hays Morgan Jr. (1898–1983), Swiss-born American diplomat, society figure and actor
Harry Morgan (cricketer) (born 1938), New Zealand cricketer, for the Wellington Firebirds (1963-1978)

Harry Morgan (journalist), American television journalist and producer, producer of 1967 documentary CBS Reports: The Homosexuals

Fictional characters
Harry Morgan (Dexter), character in the TV series Dexter and the books it is based on
Harry Morgan, character in the Ernest Hemingway novel To Have and Have Not, (played by Humphrey Bogart in the 1944 film To Have and Have Not)

See also
Henry Morgan (disambiguation)
Harri Morgan, Welsh rugby union player